Edwin Dayan Móvil Cabrera (born 7 May 1986), known as Edwin Móvil, is a Colombian footballer who plays for Deportivo Pereira.

Móvil plays as a central midfielder. He played with the Colombian U-20 national team at the 2005 South American Youth Championship, which Colombia hosted and won. He then competed at the 2005 FIFA World Youth Championship in the Netherlands, helping Colombia to the Round of 16 before losing to eventual champion Argentina. He was a member of the 2005 Colombian Sub 20 that won the Sudamericana.

Notes

References

External links
 
 

1986 births
Living people
Colombian footballers
Colombian expatriate footballers
Colombia youth international footballers
Colombia international footballers
Once Caldas footballers
Boyacá Chicó F.C. footballers
Club Atlético Belgrano footballers
Cúcuta Deportivo footballers
Deportivo Pereira footballers
Categoría Primera A players
Primera Nacional players
Association football midfielders
Footballers from Barranquilla
Colombian expatriate sportspeople in Argentina
Expatriate footballers in Argentina